Abdel Moneim Wahby (11 November 1911 – 8 May 1988) was an Egyptian basketball player who played for Al Ahly, referee and administrator. He played for the Egypt national basketball team in the 1936 Olympics. As a referee, he worked at the 1948 Olympics and 1952 Olympics (including the USA-USSR final). He served as the president of the Egyptian Basketball Federation (1952-1969), president of AFABA (current FIBA Africa) (1961-1969), Vice President of the FIBA (1961-1968), President of the FIBA (1968-1976) and President of the Egyptian Olympic Committee (1972-1974). He was enshrined as a contributor in the FIBA Hall of Fame in 2007.

References

External links
 FIBA Hall of Fame page on Wahby

1911 births
1988 deaths
FIBA Hall of Fame inductees
Basketball in Egypt
Egyptian men's basketball players
Olympic basketball players of Egypt
Basketball players at the 1936 Summer Olympics